1997 Yokohama Flügels season

Competitions

Domestic results

J.League

Emperor's Cup

J.League Cup

Player statistics

 † player(s) joined the team after the opening of this season.

Transfers

In:

Out:

Transfers during the season

In
Takashi Sakurai (loan return from Gimnasia on June)
Fernando Luiz Rech (on July)
Anderson Gils de Sampaio (from Flamengo on September)

Out
Atsuhiko Mori (to Consadole Sapporo)

Awards
J.League Best XI: Motohiro Yamaguchi

References
J.LEAGUE OFFICIAL GUIDE 1997, 1997 
J.LEAGUE OFFICIAL GUIDE 1998, 1996 
J.LEAGUE YEARBOOK 1999, 1999

Other pages
 J. League official site
 Yokohama F. Marinos official web site

Yokohama Flugels
Yokohama Flügels seasons